Arkadiusz Wojtas (born 29 October 1977) is a Polish former cyclist.

Major results

2000
1st Stage 2 Peace Race
1st Overall Ringerike GP
1st Stage 1
2002
3rd Overall Tour de Normandie
1st Stage 4
2004
1st Coupe des Carpathes
3rd Overall Tour de Normandie

References

1977 births
Living people
Polish male cyclists
People from Gdańsk County